The 1942 Notre Dame Fighting Irish football team was an American football team that represented the University of Notre Dame as an independent during the 1942 college football season. In their second year under head coach Frank Leahy, the team compiled a 7–2–2 record, outscored opponents by a total of 184 to 99, and was ranked No. 6 in the final AP poll.

The team ranked eighth nationally with 1,039 passing yards. Angelo Bertelli was responsible for all of the team's passing yardage and ranked seventh nationally in individual passing yards.

End Bob Dove was a consensus pick on the 1942 All-America college football team. Angelo Bertelli was selected as a first-team All-American by Look magazine.

Schedule

References

Notre Dame
Notre Dame Fighting Irish football seasons
Notre Dame Fighting Irish football